Bertha Harris (December 17, 1937 – May 22, 2005) was an American lesbian novelist. She is highly regarded by critics and admirers, but her novels are less familiar to the broader public.

Personal life 
Bertha Anne Harris was born in Fayetteville, North Carolina on December 17, 1937 to John Holmes Harris and Mary Zeleka Jones.

In 1959, Harris graduated from the Women's College of University of North Carolina. Upon graduation, she moved to New York City at age twenty-two, spending her summers in Westport, Massachusetts. She stated that she wanted to live in New York "to find lesbians", but, ended up in a brief heterosexual marriage and had a daughter, Jennifer Harris Wyland. To support herself and her daughter, she worked as an editor and proofreader for a time, before returning to North Carolina to receive her M.F.A.

Harris returned to New York by at least 1984.

She died at age 67, on May 22, 2005, in New York City.

Career 
Harris began her career as she was completing her M.F.A. in North Carolina. As part of her degree requirements, she wrote what would end up being her first novel, Catching Saradove, published in 1969. The novel was semi-autobiographical and is probably her novel that comes closest to conventional fiction.

From 1969-1972, Harris was a professor at East Carolina University and at UNC Charlotte.  She was later the director of Women's Studies and a Professor of Performing and Creative Arts at the College of Staten Island CUNY.

Harris has said that she is obsessed by two things: music (particularly opera) and the South. These two obsessions define her second novel, Confessions of Cherubino, published in 1972. However, she is most well known for her stylistically bold third novel, Lover, published in 1976. Lover was brought out by the Vermont-based independent publisher Daughters, Inc., a small publisher of women's fiction. She says she wrote it "straight from the libido, while I was madly in love, and liberated by the lesbian cultural movement of the mid-1970s."

In all three of Harris' novels, she engages the aesthetics of late twentieth-century literature; they may be considered examples of literary postmodernism. Her novels are stylistically akin to the work of modernist authors as Virginia Woolf, Gertrude Stein, and Djuna Barnes (whom Harris greatly admired). She once proclaimed that Djuna Barnes's work was "practically the only available expression of lesbian culture we have in the modern western world" since Sappho. Much of Harris's work, most notably Lover, is written with the women's movement of the 1970s as its primary inspiration and its audience. Indeed, Lover might be viewed as a literary mother of queer theory; her novel resonates almost as strongly with third-wave feminism as it does with the second-wave feminism of its origins.

Harris co-authored The Joy of Lesbian Sex in 1977 with Emily L. Sisley. Lover was reissued in 1993 by the New York University Press with a preface by Karla Jay and a new introduction by the author, mainly recounting her involvement with Daughters Press and its owners, June Arnold and Parke Bowman.

At the time of her death she was completing her fourth novel, a comedy, Mi Contra Fa.

The Bertha Harris Women's Center at the College of Staten Island is named after Harris.

Selected works 

 Catching Saradove (1969)
 Confessions of Cherubino (1972)
 Lover (1976)

Further reading 

 "Bertha Harris Papers, 1969" at J. Murrey Atkins Library, UNC Charlotte.

References

1937 births
2005 deaths
American lesbian writers
American feminist writers
Postmodern writers
Feminist fiction
American women novelists
20th-century American novelists
20th-century American women writers
American LGBT novelists
LGBT people from North Carolina
College of Staten Island faculty
20th-century American LGBT people
21st-century American LGBT people
21st-century American women writers